Belomitra viridis is a species of sea snail, a marine gastropod mollusc in the family Belomitridae.

Description

Distribution

References

 Okutani T., ed. (2000) Marine mollusks in Japan. Tokai University Press. 1173 pp

External links
 Kantor Yu.I., Puillandre N., Rivasseau A. & Bouchet P. (2012) Neither a buccinid nor a turrid: A new family of deep-sea snails for Belomitra P. Fischer, 1883 (Mollusca, Neogastropoda), with a review of Recent Indo-Pacific species. Zootaxa 3496: 1–64.

Belomitridae
Gastropods described in 1966